The relationship between Buddhism and democracy has a long history with many scholars claiming the very foundations of Buddhist society were democratic. Though some historic Buddhist societies have been categorized as feudalistic, the relationship between peasants and land owners was often voluntary. Free-thinking Buddhist societies supported autonomy; peasants had mobility and could own land themselves.

Modern views
The father of the Constitution of India and a pioneer of India's democracy, B. R. Ambedkar believed Buddhism to be a Democratic religion which led to his conversion and founding of the Navayana school of Buddhism. In an All-India Radio broadcast speech on 3 October 1954 Ambedkar declared:

Ambedkar also reminds of the existence of Democratic practices in Buddhist brotherhood. 

14th Dalai Lama believes that both Buddhism and Democracy share a common viewpoint saying "not only are Buddhism and democracy compatible, they are rooted in a common understanding of the equality and potential of every individual." He believes that the ancient Sangha functioned democratically.

Mipham Chokyi Lodro, the 14th Shamar Rinpoche, wrote a book, "Creating a Transparent Democracy" in 2006. Shamarpa proposes a transparent democracy where each citizen has self reliance and empowerment through a decentralized government system. Rather than a top-down control system, in which power flows down from national, to state to city, the system builds from village level up. Local units on the village level, combine to form the higher levels of government as well. The system relies on the banning of all propaganda, the dissolving of political parties and an education system that teaches competence in governance to all citizens. Transparency and self-reliance are indeed Buddhist values, but also universal... Where Shamarpa's proposal becomes distinctly Buddhist is his definition of the function of law. Protections are provided to the (1) Earth, natural environment, (2) human beings, and (3) animals. The Earth itself serves as the model for an ideal government, and it is the international community's responsibility to protect the natural environment.

David Kaczynski believes that Buddhism and Democracy need each other saying:

History

Early Buddhism

The spread of Buddhism led to the spread of Democratic values throughout Asia. Kurt Kankan Spellmeyer stated Buddhism and Democracy have gone hand-in-hand since the beginning.

Egon Flaig concurs claiming that early Buddhist practices were an outgrowth from republican city-states of ancient India. He describes them as "often governed by a council of nobles (sabha) made up of male aristocrats, ruling either on its own or with the help of an assembly (samiti)." Ajahn Brahm claims "the longest sustaining democracy in the world is the Buddhist sangha."

Mahāsammata
The Aggañña Sutta of the Pali Canon introduces a figure named "Mahāsammata" (Pali; lit. "the Great Elect") as the first monarch. The scripture elaborates on the formation of civilization that occurred with the adoption of ownership. As theft became a major societal concern, it was decided that a ruler should be elected to ensure the punishment of evil and preservation of righteousness.

Mahāsammata is also said to have been responsible for the establishment of caste and law.

Later Buddhism
German historian Markus Rüttermann has found in the 12th through the 14th centuries "several Japanese monasteries were making decisions by majority vote."

Tibetan Buddhism
After the 16th century in Tibet, Buddhist leaders were inseparable from government administrators. The concept of samayas, vows to the guru, became a tool for suppressing people's rights and manipulating political authority.

Shamar Rinpoche of the Karma Kagyu Lineage saw religion and politics as working against each other in Tibet. Lamas as a ruling class gave the country enduring structure and order, but as many people put unquestioning faith in their spiritual leaders, it left very little room for critical judgement of political decisions. These concerns were put forward by Shamarpa at a meeting in Varanasi India in 1998, called by the Dalai Lama. The meeting was attended by heads of Tibetan schools as an effort to better the future of Tibetans.

See also
Buddhist economics
Buddhist socialism
Engaged Buddhism

References

External links
Influence of Buddhism on Indian Constitution and Indian democracy by Dr. S.H. Hosamani
Buddhists in a Democracy: Be Political, But Not Partisan

Further reading
 Shamar Rinpoche. "Creating a Transparent Democracy: A New Model."Bird of Paradise Press (2006). 
 Kancha Ilaiah's Phd thesis God as Political Philosopher: Buddha's Challenge to Brahminism (Calcutta: Samya, 2001) . The book is about political thoughts of the Buddha.

Buddhism and politics
Democracy
Democracy movements
Political ideologies